The 1962 CONCACAF Champions' Cup was the 1st edition of the annual international club football competition held in the CONCACAF region (North America, Central America and the Caribbean), the CONCACAF Champions' Cup. It determined that year's club champion of association football in the CONCACAF region.

The tournament was contested by eight teams from seven different nations: Netherlands Antilles, Costa Rica, El Salvador, Guatemala, Haiti, Honduras and Mexico.
The tournament was played from 25 March 1962 to 21 August 1962.

The tournament was split in three zones (North American, Central American and Caribbean), each one qualifying the winner to the final tournament, where the winners of the Central and Caribbean groups played a semi-final to decide who was going to play against the Northern group champion in the final. All the matches in the tournament were played under the home/away match system.

CD Guadalajara won that final, and became the first CONCACAF club champion.

First round

Second round

Semifinal

Final

First leg

Second leg 

Guadalajara won 6–0 on aggregate

Champion

Final rankings

References

1962 in CONCACAF football
CONCACAF Champions' Cup
c